Ebute Ero Market is a market  located in Ebute Ero, a town in Lagos State, Nigeria. Ebute Ero Market is situated south of Makoko, close to Brown Square.

The market is one of the oldest and largest market in Nigeria.

In January 2013, a mysterious stone with Arabic inscription was found on the floor of the market.

References

Buildings and structures in Lagos State
Retail markets in Lagos